Karibi-ilu was a Mukarrib of Saba' reigned in 700–680 BC. The name Karibi-ilu in Akkadian matches "Karab-El Bayin" in Sabaean, combined of "KRB-El" which means one who carries out the instructions of El and "BYN" one who removes punishment.

History

Karibi-ilu is the son of Itamru (Yatha' Amar Watar II) who was mentioned by Sargon II in 715 BC.

An Assyrian text which dates back to c. 685 BC talks about the gifts sent to Sennacherib from Karibi-ilu. The gifts consisted of silver, gold, types of the most exquisite perfume called "Rikke Tabutu" and precious gem stones which have traditionally been exported from South Arabia. Karibi-ilu built a house or a temple called "Bit-Akitu", to celebrate the New Year's and other holidays.

See also
List of rulers of Saba and Himyar

References

Mukaribs of Saba
Ancient history of Yemen
Middle Eastern kings
7th-century BC Yemeni people